van der Kellen is a surname. Notable people with the surname include:

David van der Kellen Sr. (1764-1825), Dutch engraver
David van der Kellen Jr. (1804-1879), Dutch engraver, son of former
David van der Kellen Jr.(III) (1827-1895), Dutch painter, son of former

See also
Wilberd van der Kallen (born 1947), Dutch mathematician

Surnames of Dutch origin